The men's discus throw was one of six throwing events on the Athletics at the 1908 Summer Olympics programme in London. The competition was held on July 16, 1908. 42 throwers from eleven nations competed. NOCs could enter up to 12 athletes. The event was won by Martin Sheridan of the United States, his second consecutive victory in the event (third if the 1906 Intercalated Games are included). The Americans completed their first sweep in the discus throw, with Merritt Giffin taking silver and Bill Horr bronze.

Background

This was the fourth appearance of the event, which is one of 12 athletics events to have been held at every Summer Olympics. The returning competitors from 1904 were defending champion Martin Sheridan of the United States, bronze medalist Nikolaos Georgantas of Greece, and fourth-place finisher (and 1900 competitor) John Flanagan of the United States. Sheridan, who had also won the 1906 Intercalated Games discus throw, was heavily favored, "unequaled as a discus thrower."

Finland, Germany, Italy, and Norway each made their debut in the men's discus throw. Greece and the United States each made their fourth appearance, having competed in every edition of the Olympic men's discus throw to date.

Competition format

The competition continued to use the single, divided-final format in use since 1896. Each athlete received three throws, with the top three receiving an additional three throws. This event was one of two discus throwing events in 1908 and was referred to as the "free style" throw; the other was throwing the discus "as at Athens." For this event, the athletes threw the discus from inside a 2.5 metre diameter circle. There were no rules on form ("The method of throwing is at the absolute discretion of each competitor"), though the thrower had to remain in the circle until the discus hit the ground. The landing area was a 45 degree sector, broader than the modern 34.92 degrees.

Records

These were the standing world and Olympic records (in metres) prior to the 1908 Summer Olympics.

* unofficial

The top four men all threw beyond the old Olympic record in the qualifying throws. Martin Sheridan finished with the best throw and the new record, at 40.89 metres.

Results

Giffin's first throw (40.70 metres) was his best and gave him the lead until the final round. Sheridan threw 40.89 metres on his final attempt to win. 23 athletes did not start.

References

Sources
 Official Report of the Games of the IV Olympiad (1908).
 De Wael, Herman. Herman's Full Olympians: "Athletics 1908". Accessed 7 April 2006.

Athletics at the 1908 Summer Olympics
Discus throw at the Olympics